Miroslav Příložný (born 27 November 1955, in Duchcov) is a retired Czechoslovakian forward.

External links
 

1955 births
Living people
Czechoslovak footballers
Association football forwards
SK Slavia Prague players
FK Mladá Boleslav players
Bohemians 1905 players
SK Sigma Olomouc players
SK Vorwärts Steyr players
AEL Limassol players